"Because" is a song by Greek singer Demis Roussos. It was released as a single in 1977.

The song was part of the 1977 Demis Roussos album The Demis Roussos Magic.

Background and writing 
The song "Because" was written by Vangelis Papathanassiou and Alec R. Costandinos. The recording was arranged and produced by Vangelis.

There were also a French version and a Spanish version of this song. The French version, titled "Mourir auprès de mon amour", was also released as a single in 1977. It was included on Roussos' 1977 French-language album Ainsi soit-il. The Spanish version, titled "Morir al lado de mi amor", was as well released as a single in 1977.

Commercial performance 
The single "Because" reached no. 39 in the UK.

The French version of the song, "Mourir auprès de mon amour", reached no. 26 in Flanders (Belgium) and no. 2 in Wallonia (Belgium).

Track listings

"Because" 
7" single Philips 6042 245 (1977, Germany, Netherlands, etc.)
 A. "Because" (4:10)
 B. "Maybe Someday" (3:17)

"Mourir auprès de mon amour (Because) / I Dig You" 
7" single Philips 6042 262 (1977, France, Canada)
 A. "Mourir auprès de mon amour" (4:18)
 B. "I Dig You" (4:06)

"Morir al lado de mi amor (Because) / I Dig You" 
7" single Philips 6042 289 (1977, Spain)
 A. "Mourir auprès de mon amour" (4:18)
 B. "I Dig You" (4:06)

"Morir al lado de mi amor" 
7" single Philips 11166 (Panama)
 A. "Morir al lado de mi amor"
 B. "Day-O (Banana Boat Song)"
 Fabricado por sono Mindi, S. A. (Panamá, R. de P.) bajo licencia de Philips.

Charts

"Because"

"Mourir auprès de mon amour" 

 Charted posthumously in 2015

References

External links 
 Demis Roussos — "Because" at Discogs
 Demis Roussos — "Mourir auprès de mon amour (Because) / I Dig You" at Discogs

1977 songs
1977 singles
Demis Roussos songs
Philips Records singles
Song recordings produced by Vangelis
Songs written by Alec R. Costandinos
Songs with music by Vangelis